Emil Ivanov (born  30 June 1962 in Sofia) is a Bulgarian former wrestler who won the world championship in 1986 and 1989.

External links
 

1962 births
Living people
Sportspeople from Sofia
Bulgarian male sport wrestlers
World Wrestling Championships medalists
20th-century Bulgarian people
21st-century Bulgarian people